Top Dog Model is a British reality dog competition show that aired on ITV2 from 5 September to 10 October 2012. The judging panel consists of head judge Stacey Solomon, Lilah Parsons and Addison Witt. Britain's Got Talent winners Ashleigh and Pudsey feature in various episodes, demonstrating tasks and offering advice to the contestants.

Format
The show will aim to find Britain's next talented canine, that will star in an ad campaign for household product Cif PowerPro Naturals.

References

2012 British television series debuts
2012 British television series endings
ITV (TV network) original programming
Television series by ITV Studios